Baitun Nasr Mosque also known as the Furuset Mosque is an Ahmadi Muslim mosque in Furuset in the borough of Alna, northeast of Oslo, Norway. The mosque is the largest in the country, and can accommodate up to 5,000 people. The mosque has one dome and one minaret on the south side and the complex is located near E6, the country's main north–south highway.

References

2011 establishments in Norway
Ahmadiyya mosques in Norway
Religious buildings and structures in Oslo
Mosques completed in 2011